Litherland is a town in the Metropolitan Borough of Sefton, Merseyside. It was an urban district, which included Seaforth and Ford.

History

Historically in Lancashire, the name Litherland is a hybrid name, from Old Norse hlið/hlith-ar which means "slope" and Old English land "land".

Litherland was mentioned in the Domesday Book of 1086 as Liderlant, however there was no mention of Liverpool at that time. The first manor of Litherland consisted of one half and two quarters, the areas being Litherland including what is now Seaforth (the half) and present day Orrell and Ford (the two quarters).

Litherland remained a poor area until the arrival of the Leeds and Liverpool Canal in 1774, this brought the area into the modern world, originally providing a safe route through Lancashire from Liverpool to Wigan, and eventually in 1816 through to Leeds. The route became very busy primarily for goods and later for the transportation of passengers. The outcome of all this activity was to bring prosperous businessmen from the city to the countryside, where they had a desire to live. The canal was crossed by a mechanical lifting bridge built in 1934 (replacing an earlier swing bridge) which was demolished in 1974.

The area was the northern extremity of the Bootle and North Docks lines of Liverpool's tramway network. From the boundary with Bootle, it ran for ¾ of a mile along Linacre Road to a terminus at the junction with Bridge Road. This short stretch was the last horse drawn service in Liverpool, switching to electric operation in August 1903, eight months after the rest of the system converted.

The Litherland Gala was staged every year and was famous for the procession of shire horses and floats from the docks. The gala procession ended at the Bryant and May sports field.

Litherland Town Hall was officially opened in February 1941: The Beatles played some of their earliest gigs there in 1961.

Governance
For parliamentary elections Litherland is within the Bootle constituency represented by the Labour Party MP Peter Dowd.

Litherland returns six members to Sefton Council from two electoral wards, each with three representatives. The Litherland ward is represented by Patricia Hardy, John Kelly, and Paul Tweed; the Ford ward's representatives are Owen Brady, Kevin Cluskey and Ian Moncur. All six are members of the Labour Party.

Education
Primary schools in the area include Beach road primary school, Hatton Hill Primary School, English Martyrs' Catholic Primary School, Litherland Moss Primary School, Lander Road Primary School , Our Lady Queen of Peace Catholic Primary School, St Elizabeth's Catholic Primary School and St Philip's Church of England Controlled Primary School. Litherland High School is the main secondary school in the area, while Rowan Park School is a special school for 2 to 19 year-olds.

South Sefton College is a sixth form which serves students in Litherland as well as the wider southern part of the Metropolitan Borough of Sefton.

Transport
Litherland is served by Seaforth & Litherland railway station on the Hunts Cross to Southport line of the Merseyrail network. The main road is the A5036 road, which connects to Switch Island and the A565 road at Seaforth Dock.

See also
Listed buildings in Litherland

References

External links

 Liverpool Street Gallery - Liverpool 21
 Litherland & Ford Digital Album
 The Litherland Picture Post

Towns in Merseyside
Towns and villages in the Metropolitan Borough of Sefton
Liverpool Urban Area
Unparished areas in Merseyside